Afreumenes moseri is a species of potter wasp in the family Vespidae. It was described by Schulz and 1906.

Subspecies
 Afreumenes moseri moseri (Schulz, 1906)
 Afreumenes moseri bidimidiatus Giordani Soika, 1968

References

Potter wasps
Insects described in 1906